The subtribe Creobiina is a group of beetles in the Broscini tribe of Carabidae (the ground beetles) and is found in Australia, New Zealand and South America.

Description 
Creobiina has 11 genera:
 Acallistus: 4 species
 Adotela: 17 species
 Anheterus: 3 species
 Bountya: 1 species
 Brithysternum: 3 species
 Cascellius: 2 species
 Cerotalis: 7 species
 Creobius: 1 species
 Gnathoxys: 17 species
 Nothocascellius: 2 species
 Promecoderus: 40 species

References 

Insect subtribes